Bush Creek is a  long 3rd order tributary to the New Hope River in North Carolina.  Bush Creek joins the New Hope River within the B. Everett Jordan Lake Reservoir.

Course
Bush Creek rises on the Pokeberry Creek divide in Farrington Village, North Carolina.  Bush Creek then flows northeast and then turns southeast to meet New Hope River in the B. Everett Jordan Lake Reservoir in Chatham County.

Watershed
Bush Creek drains  of area, receives about 47.3 in/year of precipitation, has a topographic wetness index of 405.13, and has an average water temperature of 15.07 °C.  The watershed is 52% forested.

References

Rivers of North Carolina
Rivers of Chatham County, North Carolina